Amitabh Singh is an Indian Space Scientist. He was Project Manager  for Chandrayaan-1 Mission and Deputy Project Director & Operation Director for Chandrayaan-2 Mission at Indian Space Research Organization. He handled the optical payload data processing and on-board algorithm related to Chandrayaan-2 Lander and Rover. He is also a Guest Faculty at Department of Physics, Electronics & Space Science of the Gujarat University. He is working for upcoming Chandrayaan-3 project.

He has authored some books on Chandrayaan 1 and articles on Planetary Geomatics and Exploring the Moon in three dimension.

He has been awarded the ISRS Young Achiever Award  by the Indian Society of Remote Sensing, Dehradun.

Early life 
Amitabh Singh was born at Kubauli village of Samastipur district in Bihar. His wife is a senior doctor.

Education

Anugrah Narayan College, Patna 
He studied M.Sc (Electronics) from Department of Physics, A N College Patna.

BIT, Mesra 
He studied M.Tech from Birla Institute of Technology, Mesra.

Bibliography 

 Chandrayaan-1 se liye gaye Chandrama Ke Pratibimb, 
 Images of Moon from Chandrayaan-1,

Awards 

 ISRS Young Achiever Award (2008)

References 

Indian Space Research Organisation
Physics educators
Living people
Year of birth missing (living people)

People from Samastipur
Mithila